(born 23 March 1929, Tokyo) is a Japanese actor, comedian and bassist. Inuzuka is one of the members of the Crazy Cats.

His first starring role in the film was in Suteki na Konban wa directed by Yoshitarō Nomura and played the leading roles in six films in his acting career. Inuzuka announced his retirement as an actor and made his final appearance in Labyrinth of Cinema directed by Nobuhiko Obayashi in 2019. Since then, he has been retired in Atami.

Selected works

Films

 Ten Dark Women (1961)
 Crazy Adventure (1965)
 Suteki na Konban wa (1965)
 Kyu-chan no Dekkai Yume (1967)
 Where Spring Comes Late (1970)
 Tora-san, the Good Samaritan (1971) as Policeman
 Daigoro vs. Goliath (1972) as Ojisan
 Preparation for the Festival (1975)
 Yakyū-kyō no Uta (1977)
 Stage-Struck Tora-san (1978)
 Tora-san, the Matchmaker (1979) as Taxi driver
 Tora-san's Dream of Spring (1979)
 Tora-san's Promise (1981) as Shigeru
 Eijanaika (1981) as Yomome no Roku
 Samurai Reincarnation (1981) as Sōgorō
 Aiko 16 sai (1983) as Mita Shirō
 Kaisha monogatari: Memories of You (1988) as Inuyama Hiroshi
 Kazeno Kodomono Yōni (1992) as Shigeyuki Mineyama
 Kamen Rider ZO (1993) as Seikichi Mochizuki
 Tora-san to the Rescue (1995) as taxi driver
 A Class to Remember IV (2000) as Shukichi
 Women in the Mirror (2003)
 Goodbye Me (2007) as Konosuke Saitō
 Chameleon (2008) as Shuji Yamamura
 Tsure ga Utsu ni Narimashite (2011) as Kawaji
 Casting Blossoms to the Sky (2012) as Tsurukichi Nose
 Giovanni's Island (2014)
 Labyrinth of Cinema (2019)

Television
 Shin Hissatsu Shiokinin (1977) (ep.18) as Sanai Hattori
 Hattori Hanzō: Kage no Gundan (1980) as Ikoma
 Shin Hissatsu Shigotonin (1981) (ep.25) as Hidaka
 Onihei Hankachō Ryusei (1990)
 Kokoro (2003) as Sadao Yoshikawa
 Ultraman Max (2005) (ep.26)
 Ohisama (2011) as Takeo Miyamoto

References

1929 births
Living people
Japanese comedians
Japanese male actors
People from Tokyo